The 2009 Cronulla-Sutherland Sharks season was the 43rd in the club's history. They competed in the NRL's 2009 Telstra Premiership.

Ladder

Fixtures

Trial matches

Regular season

References

Cronulla-Sutherland Sharks seasons
Cronulla-Sutherland Sharks season